Felice Minotti (19 November 1887 – 21 March 1963) was an Italian film actor. He appeared in 91 films between 1908 and 1963.

Selected filmography

 The Revenge of Maciste (1921)
 Maciste on Vacation (1921)
 The House of Pulcini (1924)
 Chief Saetta (1924)
 Emperor Maciste (1924)
 The Courier of Moncenisio (1927)
 Maciste against the Sheik (1926)
 The Giant of the Dolomites (1927)
 Company and the Crazy (1928)
 The Last Tsars (1928)
 Judith and Holofernes (1929)
 When Naples Sings (1930)
 Villafranca (1934)
 Don Bosco (1935)
 Under the Southern Cross (1938)
 Pietro Micca (1938)
 The Sin of Rogelia Sanchez (1940)
 Blood Wedding (1941)
 The Son of the Red Corsair (1943)
 Two Hearts (1943)
 A Yank in Rome (1946)
 His Young Wife (1946)
 Eleven Men and a Ball (1948)
 Sicilian Uprising (1949)
 Anthony of Padua (1949)
 Women and Brigands (1950)
 Nobody's Children (1951)
 Piece of the Sky (1959)

References

External links

1887 births
1963 deaths
Italian male film actors
Italian male silent film actors
20th-century Italian male actors